Tin Maung Ni (5 May 1938 – 2 April 1974) was a Myanmar swimmer who took part in two Olympic Games. Tin Maung Ni was born in Bhamo, Kachin State, Myanmar. He was the fourth of five siblings.

Swimming career 
From the age of fifteen, he started his swimming career, after winning the regional swimming competitions. In 1958, he went to University of Rangoon after finishing the matriculation examination. In his freshman year, he participated in the Yangon All Clubs Swimming Competition and broke all the national records in 100 metres, 200 metres, 400 metre, 800 metres and 1500 metres.

In 1959, Matsui Dar, a Japanese swimming trainer, became his coach and participated in the South East Asian Games in Bangkok and wrote new records in 100 metres and 200 metres freestyle swimming.

In 1960, he participated in the Rome Olympics. He also won gold medals in 200 metres, 400 metres and 1500 metres and a silver medal in 100 metres swimming in second South East Asian Games in Jakarta, Indonesia.

In 1961, Tin Maung Ni participated in swimming competition in Hapoel Celebration in Israel and won gold medal in 1500 m swimming and silver medals in 200 and 400 metres swimming.

In 1961 SEAP Games Yangon, he won gold medals in 1500 metres, 200 metres and 400 metres individual free style swimming and broke the records 400 metres in freestyle relay.

In 1962, he participated in Asian Olympic games and won gold medals in 1500m and 400m freestyle swimming. He also got a Bronze medal in 200 metres swimming.

With these results, Tin Maung Ni participated in 1964 Tokyo Olympic, racing in 400 m and 1500 m freestyles and finished 6th and 4th in his heats, respectively.

He died on 2 April 1974, before his 36th birthday.

References

External links
 

1938 births
1974 deaths
People from Kachin State
Burmese male freestyle swimmers
Olympic swimmers of Myanmar
Swimmers at the 1960 Summer Olympics
Swimmers at the 1964 Summer Olympics
Asian Games gold medalists for Myanmar
Asian Games bronze medalists for Myanmar
Asian Games medalists in swimming
Swimmers at the 1962 Asian Games
Medalists at the 1962 Asian Games
Southeast Asian Games medalists in swimming
Southeast Asian Games gold medalists for Myanmar
Southeast Asian Games bronze medalists for Myanmar
Southeast Asian Games silver medalists for Myanmar
Competitors at the 1959 Southeast Asian Peninsular Games
Competitors at the 1961 Southeast Asian Peninsular Games
Competitors at the 1965 Southeast Asian Peninsular Games